Haaretz (originally Ḥadshot Haaretz –) is an Israeli newspaper. It was founded in 1918, making it the longest running newspaper currently in print in Israel, and is now published in both Hebrew and English in the Berliner format. The English edition is published and sold together with the International New York Times. Both Hebrew and English editions can be read on the internet. In North America, it is published as a weekly newspaper, combining articles from the Friday edition with a roundup from the rest of the week. It is considered Israel's newspaper of record. It is known for its left-wing and liberal stances on domestic and foreign issues.

 Haaretz has the third-largest circulation in Israel. It is widely read by international observers, especially in its English edition, and discussed in the international press. According to the Center for Research Libraries, among Israel's daily newspapers, "Haaretz is considered the most influential and respected for both its news coverage and its commentary."

History and ownership
Haaretz was first published in 1918 as a newspaper sponsored by the British military government in Palestine. In 1919, it was taken over by a group of socialist-oriented Zionists, mainly from Russia. The newspaper was established on 18 June 1919 by a group of businessmen including the philanthropist Isaac Leib Goldberg, and initially, it was called Hadashot Ha'aretz ("News of the Land"). Later, the name was shortened to Haaretz. The literary section of the paper attracted leading Hebrew writers of the time.

The newspaper was initially published in Jerusalem. From 1919 to 1922, the paper was headed by a succession of editors, among them Leib Yaffe. It was closed briefly due to a budgetary shortfall and reopened in Tel Aviv at the beginning of 1923 under the editorship of Moshe Glickson, who held the post for 15 years. The Tel Aviv municipality granted the paper financial support by paying in advance for future advertisements.

Throughout the 1920s and 1930s, Haaretzs liberal viewpoint was to some degree associated with the General Zionist "A" faction, which later helped form the Progressive Party, though it was nonpartisan and careful not to espouse any specific party line. It was considered the most sophisticated of the Yishuv's dailies.

Salman Schocken, a Jewish businessman who left Germany in 1934 after the Nazis had come to power, bought the paper in December 1935. Schocken was active in Brit Shalom, also known as the Jewish–Palestinian Peace Alliance, a body supporting co-existence between Jews and Arabs which was sympathetic to a homeland for both peoples. His son, Gershom Schocken, became the chief editor in 1939 and held that position until his death in 1990.

The Schocken family were the sole owners of the Haaretz Group until August 2006, when they sold a 25% stake to German publisher M. DuMont Schauberg. The deal was negotiated with the help of the former Israeli ambassador to Germany, Avi Primor. This deal was seen as controversial in Israel as DuMont Schauberg's father, Kurt Neven DuMont, was member of the Nazi Party and his publishing house promoted Nazi ideology.

On 12 June 2011, it was announced that Russian-Israeli businessman Leonid Nevzlin had purchased a 20% stake in the Haaretz Group, buying 15% from the family and 5% from M. DuMont Schauberg. In December 2019, members of the Schocken family bought all of the Haaretz stock belonging to M. DuMont Schauberg. The deal saw the Schocken family reach 75% ownership, with the remaining 25% owned by Leonid Nevzlin.

In October 2012, a union strike mobilized to protest planned layoffs by the Haaretz management, causing a one-day interruption of Haaretz and its TheMarker business supplement. According to Israel Radio, it was the first time since 1965 that a newspaper did not go to press on account of a strike.

Management
The newspaper's editorial policy was defined by Gershom Schocken, who was editor-in-chief from 1939 to 1990. Schocken was succeeded as editor-in-chief by Hanoch Marmari. In 2004 David Landau replaced Marmari and was succeeded by Dov Alfon in 2008. The current editor-in-chief of the newspaper is Aluf Benn, who replaced Alfon in August 2011. Charlotte Halle became editor of the English print edition in February 2008.

Walter Gross was a member of the governing editorial board and a columnist with the paper from 1951 to 1995.

Editorial policy and viewpoints
Haaretz describes itself as having "a broadly liberal outlook both on domestic issues and on international affairs", and has been summarized as being "liberal on security, civil rights and economy, supportive of the Supreme Court, very critical of Netanyahu's government". Others describe it alternatively as liberal, centre-left, left-wing, and the country's only major left-leaning newspaper. The newspaper opposes retaining control of the territories and consistently supports peace initiatives. The Haaretz editorial line is supportive of weaker elements in Israeli society, such as sex workers, foreign laborers, Israeli Arabs, Ethiopian immigrants, and Russian immigrants.

In 2006, the BBC said that Haaretz takes a moderate stance on foreign policy and security. David Remnick in The New Yorker described Haaretz as "easily the most liberal newspaper in Israel", its ideology as left-wing and its temper as "insistently oppositional". According to Ira Sharkansky, Haaretzs op-ed pages are open to a variety of opinions. J. J. Goldberg, the editor of the American The Jewish Daily Forward, describes Haaretz as "Israel's most vehemently anti-settlement daily paper". Stephen Glain of The Nation described Haaretz as "Israel's liberal beacon", citing its editorials voicing opposition to the occupation, the discriminatory treatment of Arab citizens, and the mindset that led to the Second Lebanon War. A 2003 study in The International Journal of Press/Politics concluded that Haaretzs reporting of the Israeli–Palestinian conflict was more favorable to Israelis than to Palestinians but less so than that of The New York Times. In 2016, Jeffrey Goldberg, the editor-in-chief of The Atlantic, wrote: "I like a lot of the people at Haaretz, and many of its positions, but the cartoonish anti-Israelism and anti-Semitism can be grating."

Formatting, circulation, and reputation

Circulation 
In 2022, a TGI survey found that Haaretz was the newspaper with the third-largest readership in Israel, with an exposure rate of 4.7%, below Israel Hayom's rate of 31% and Yedioth Ahronoth's 23.9%.

Formatting and image 
Haaretz uses smaller headlines and print than other mass circulation papers in Israel. Less space is devoted to pictures, and more to political analysis. Opinion columns are generally written by regular commentators rather than guest writers. Its editorial pages are considered influential among government leaders. Apart from the news, Haaretz publishes feature articles on social and environmental issues, as well as book reviews, investigative reporting, and political commentary. In 2008, the newspaper itself reported a paid subscribership of 65,000, daily sales of 72,000 copies, and 100,000 on weekends. The English edition has a subscriber base of 15,000.

Readership and reception 
Despite its historically relatively low circulation in Israel, Haaretz has for many years been described as Israel's most influential daily newspaper. In 2006, it exposed a scandal regarding professional and ethical standards at Israeli hospitals. Its readership includes members of Israel's intelligentsia and members of its political and economic elites. In 1999, surveys showed that Haaretz readership had above-average education, income, and wealth, and that most were Ashkenazi Jews. Some have said that Haaretz functions in Israel much as The New York Times does in the United States, as a newspaper of record. In 2007, Shmuel Rosner, Haaretz's former U.S. correspondent, told The Nation, "people who read it are better educated and more sophisticated than most, but the rest of the country doesn't know it exists." According to Hanoch Marmari, a former Haaretz editor, the newspaper has lost its political influence in Israel because it became "detached" from the country's political life.

Andrea Levin, executive director of the pro-Israel Committee for Accuracy in Middle East Reporting in America (CAMERA), said Haaretz was doing "damage to the truth" and sometimes making serious factual errors without correcting them. According to The Jerusalem Post, Haaretz editor-in-chief David Landau said at the 2007 Limmud conference in Moscow that he had told his staff not to report on criminal investigations against Prime Minister Ariel Sharon in order to promote Sharon's 2004–2005 Gaza disengagement plan. In April 2017, Haaretz published an op-ed by a staff writer that said the Israeli religious right was worse than Hezbollah. Condemnation followed, including from Prime Minister Benjamin Netanyahu, President Reuven Rivlin, and other government ministers and MPs, as well as from Opposition Leader Isaac Herzog.

Internet editions 
Haaretz operates both Hebrew and English language websites. The two sites offer up-to-the-minute breaking news, live Q&A sessions with newsmakers from Israel, the Palestinian territories and elsewhere, and blogs covering a range of political standpoints and opinions. The two sites fall under the supervision of Lior Kodner, the head of digital media for the Haaretz Group. Individually, Simon Spungin is the editor of Haaretz.com (English) and Avi Scharf is the editor of Haaretz.co.il (Hebrew).

Offices

The Haaretz building is on Schocken Street in south Tel Aviv.

The former Haaretz building of 1932–1973 was designed by architect Joseph Berlin. It was demolished in the early 1990s, with only part of the facade preserved and integrated into the new building at 56, Maza Street.

Journalists and writers

Present

 Ruth Almog – literature, publicist
 Merav Arlosoroff – economy affairs columnist (in The Marker)
 Avraham Balaban – Tel Aviv and cultural history publicist
 Zvi Barel – Middle East affair commentator 
 Aluf Benn – editor-in-chief
 Bradley Burston – political columnist
 Saggi Cohen – food columnist
 Lily Galili
 Doram Gaunt – food columnist
 Avirama Golan
 Amos Harel – military correspondent
 Israel Harel – columnist
 Danna Harman – feature writer
 Amira Hass – Ramallah-based Palestinian affairs correspondent.
 Avi Issacharoff – military correspondent
 Uri Klein – film critic
 Yitzhak Laor – publicist
 Alex Levac – photo columnist
 Gideon Levy – Palestinian affairs columnist
 Amir Mandel – classic music critic
 Merav Michaeli – cultural and political commentator
 Amir Oren – military affairs
 Sammy Peretz – economic affairs columnist (in The Marker)
 Anshel Pfeffer – political and military affairs
 Tsafrir Rinat – environmental issues
 Guy Rolnick – economic affairs editorialist (of The Marker)
 Doron Rosenblum – satirist, publicist
 Ruth Schuster, Senior Editor for archaeology and science at the Haaretz English Edition.
 Tom Segev – historian, political commentator
 Ben Shalev – popular music critic
 Nehemia Shtrasler – economic affairs, publicist
 Simon Spungin – Managing Editor, English Edition
 Gadi Taub – political commentary
 Yossi Verter – political reporter
 Esther Zandberg – architecture
 Benny Ziffer – literature, publicist

Past

 Natan Alterman
 Moshe Arens – columnist
 Ehud Asheri
 Gidi Avivi – popular music critic
 Meron Benvenisti – political columnist
 Noam Ben Ze'ev – music critic
 Yoram Bronowski – literary critic, TV critic
 Arie Caspi
 Daniel Dagan
 Amos Elon – correspondent, editor, writer
 Boaz Evron
 Michael Handelzalts – theater critic, columnist
 Sayed Kashua – satiric columnist, author
 Jerrold Kessel
 Tami Litani
 Aviva Lori
 Yoel Marcus – political commentator, publicist
 Yossi Melman – former intelligence correspondent
 Ran Reznick – health issues
 Natasha Mozgovaya – former U.S. correspondent
 Danny Rubinstein – former Arab affairs analyst
 Gideon Samet – political commentator
 Yossi Sarid – politician, publicist
 Ze'ev Schiff – military and defense analyst
 Daniel Ben Simon
 Ruth Sinai – social welfare and humanitarian issues
 Ze'ev Sternhell – political commentary
 Ze'ev Segal – law
 Ari Shavit – political columnist
 Yair Sheleg – Jewish religious affairs
 Nadav Shragai
 Daniel Rogov – food and wine critic
 Akiva Eldar – diplomatic affairs analyst
Binyamin Tamuz -  literary critic, writer, editor of the literary supplement
 Pavel Wolberg – photographer

See also

 Culture of Israel
 Economy of Israel
 List of newspapers in Israel

References

Further reading

External links

 
  
 
 

 
1919 establishments in British-administered Palestine
Centre-left newspapers
Haaretz Group
Hebrew-language newspapers
Israeli brands
Jewish printing and publishing
Liberal media
Liberalism in Israel
Mass media in Tel Aviv
Daily newspapers published in Israel
Newspapers published in Mandatory Palestine
Non-Hebrew-language newspapers published in Israel
Newspapers established in 1919